is a Japanese rower. She competed in the women's lightweight double sculls event at the 2016 Summer Olympics.

References

External links
 

1991 births
Living people
Japanese female rowers
Olympic rowers of Japan
Rowers at the 2016 Summer Olympics
Place of birth missing (living people)
Rowers at the 2020 Summer Olympics
21st-century Japanese women